The Dark Star is a lost 1919 silent film adventure directed by Allan Dwan and starring Marion Davies. It was based on the 1917 novel by Robert W. Chambers and produced by Cosmopolitan Productions. It was released through Paramount Pictures.

Cast
Marion Davies – Rue Carew
Dorothy Green – Princess Naia
Norman Kerry – Jim Neeland
Matt Moore – Prince Alak
Ward Crane – French Secret Service Agent
George Cooper – Mr. Brandes
Arthur Earle – Mr. Stull
Gustav von Seyffertitz (*billed G. Butler Clonbough) – German Spy
Emil Hoch – Steward
Fred Hearn – Rev. William Carew
James Laffey – Ship Captain
William Brotherhood – Steward
Eddie Sturgis – 'Parson' Smalley

Production 
Marion Davies re-teamed with Norman Kerry and Matt Moore in her sixth film. Directed by Allan Dwan, this was the first film released under the banner of Cosmopolitan Productions.

References

External links
The Dark Star at IMDb.com

1919 films
American silent feature films
Lost American films
Paramount Pictures films
Films directed by Allan Dwan
Films based on American novels
Films based on works by Robert W. Chambers
American black-and-white films
American adventure drama films
1910s adventure drama films
1919 drama films
1919 lost films
Lost adventure drama films
1910s American films
Silent American drama films
Silent adventure films